Hamid al-Din is a Muslim male name formed from the elements Ḥamid and ad-Din.
It has been used for:

Hamid al-Din al-Kirmani (996–1021), Persian Isma'ili scholar
Hamidüddin Aksarayî (1331–1412), also known as Somuncu Baba, Turkish Islamic teacher
Muhammad bin Yahya Hamid ad-Din (1839–1904), Imam of Yemen
Hamiduddin Farahi (1863–1930), Indian Islamic scholar
Yahya Muhammad Hamid ed-Din (1869–1948), Imam of Yemen

Arabic masculine given names